For the school district in Iowa, see Audubon Community School District

The Audubon Public School District is a comprehensive community public school district that serves students in pre-kindergarten through twelfth grade from Audubon, in Camden County, New Jersey, United States.

As of the 2020–21 school year, the district, comprised of three schools, had an enrollment of 1,463 students and 122.2 classroom teachers (on an FTE basis), for a student–teacher ratio of 12.0:1.

The district is classified by the New Jersey Department of Education as being in District Factor Group "DE", the fifth-highest of eight groupings. District Factor Groups organize districts statewide to allow comparison by common socioeconomic characteristics of the local districts. From lowest socioeconomic status to highest, the categories are A, B, CD, DE, FG, GH, I and J.

Students from Audubon Park attend the district's schools as part of a sending/receiving relationship established after Audubon Park closed its lone school in 1979. For grades 9-12, students from Mount Ephraim attend Audubon High School, as part of a sending/receiving relationship with the Mount Ephraim Public Schools.

History
The two elementary schools in Audubon, Haviland Avenue School and Mansion Avenue School, had both served Kindergarten to sixth grade. This continued until the 2009-2010 school year when they were reconfigured so that Haviland is PreK-2 and Mansion is now grades 3-6.

Schools
Schools in the district (with 2020–21 enrollment data from the National Center for Education Statistics) are:
Elementary schools
Haviland Avenue School with 254 students in grades PreK-2
Barbra Ledyard, Principal
Mansion Avenue School with 372 students in grades 3-6
Bonnie Smeltzer, Principal
High school
Audubon High School with 818 students in grades 7-12
Jeffrey Lebb, Principal

Administration
Core members of the district's administration are:
Andrew P. Davis, Superintendent of Schools
Deborah J. Roncace, Business Administrator / Board Secretary

Board of education
The district's board of education is comprised of nine members who set policy and oversee the fiscal and educational operation of the district through its administration. As a Type II school district, the board's trustees are elected directly by voters to serve three-year terms of office on a staggered basis, with three seats up for election each year held (since 2012) as part of the November general election. The board appoints a superintendent to oversee the district's day-to-day operations and a business administrator to supervise the business functions of the district.

References

External links
Audubon School District
 

Audubon, New Jersey
Audubon Park, New Jersey
New Jersey District Factor Group DE
School districts in Camden County, New Jersey